The 1946–47 Sussex County Football League season was the 22nd in the history of the competition.

League table
The league featured 14 clubs, 11 which competed in the last season, along with three new clubs:
 Chichester
 Bexhill Town Athletic
 Eastbourne Comrades

League table

References

1946-47
9